The Mississippian Borden Formation is a mapped bedrock unit in Kentucky, Indiana, Illinois, Ohio, West Virginia, and Tennessee.  It has many members, which has led some geologists to consider it a group (for example in Indiana) rather than a formation (for example in Kentucky).

Fossils
Scyphozoans: Conularia sp. (from Borden Formation), Paraconularia sp. (from Coral Ridge Member, New Providence Shale)
Hexactinellid Sponges (from Muldraugh Formation)
Brachiopods: Orthotetes keokuk (from Borden Formation), Orbiculoidea (from Coral Ridge Member, New Providence Shale)
Trilobite: Phillibole conkini (Coral Ridge Member, New Providence Formation, Borden Group)
Cephalopods: Cantabricanites greenei, Polaricyclus ballardensis, Winchelloceras knappi (all from Coral Ridge Member, New Providence Formation, Borden Group), Muenstroceras oweni, M. parallelum, Kazakhstania colubrella, Imitoceras ixion, Masonoceras kentuckiense, Merocanites drostei, Dzhaprakoceras sp., Polaricyclus bordenensis, Winchelloceras allei (all from Nada and Cowbell Members)
Crinoids: Pachyocrinus aequalis (from Muldraugh Mbr.), Gilmocrinus kentuckyensis (from Muldraugh Mbr.), Rhodocrinites barrisi divergens, Gilbertsocrinus tuberculosus, Gilbertsocrinus typus, Actinocrinites eximius, Actinocrinites scitulus, Blairocrinus protuberatus, Steganocrinus, Uperocrinus pyriformis, Uperocrinus acuminatus, Eretmocrinus cloelia, Macrocrinus konincki, Dorycrinus quinquelobus, Aorocrinus nodulus, Agaricocrinus planoconvexus, Agaricocrinus inflatus, Dichocrinuspocillum Dichocrinus, Paradichocrinus liratus, Platycrinites glyptus, Platycrinites planus, Platycrinities spinifer, Cyathocrinites iowensis, Barycrinus spurious, Costalocrinus cornutus, Meniscocrinus, Pellecrinus obuncus, Atelestocrinus kentuckyensis, Holcocrinus spinobrachiatus, Blothrocrinus swallovi, Coeliocrinus subspinosus, Decadocrinus scalaris, Taxocrinus, Synbathocrinus dentatus, Halysiocrinus dactylus (from Nada Mbr.).
Blastoids: Granatocrinus kentuckyensis (from New Providence Shale)

A rare soft-bodied fossil that was recovered from the Farmers Member of the Borden Formation in northeastern Kentucky was interpreted as a chondrophorine float (an internal anatomical feature).

Trace fossils 
Zoophycos is present in the turbidites of the Farmers Member of the Borden Formation in Kentucky.

External links 
 Upper Devonian—Lower Mississippian clastic rocks in northeastern Kentucky: Evidence for Acadian alpine glaciation and models for source-rock and reservoir-rock development in the eastern United States, Ettensohn, F.R., Lierman, R.T., and Mason, C.E., 2009, American Institute of Professional Geologists, Kentucky Section, Spring Field Trip, April 18, 2009
 Matchen, D.L. and T.W. Kammer. 1994. Sequence stratigraphy of the Lower Mississippian Price and Borden Formations in southern West Virginia and eastern Kentucky. SOUTHEASTERN GEOLOGY, 34:25-41. PDF

References 

Geologic formations of Illinois
Geologic formations of Indiana
Geologic formations of Kentucky
Geologic formations of Ohio
Geologic formations of Tennessee
Geologic formations of West Virginia
Mississippian United States
Appalachian Mountains
Mississippian Illinois
Carboniferous Indiana
Carboniferous Kentucky
Carboniferous Ohio
Carboniferous geology of Tennessee
Carboniferous West Virginia
Carboniferous southern paleotemperate deposits
Carboniferous southern paleotropical deposits